Martin Fischer and Philipp Oswald were the defending champions, but decided not to participate.
Olivier Charroin and Stéphane Robert defeated Andis Juška and Alexandre Kudryavtsev 6–4, 6–3 in the final.

Seeds

Draw

Draw

References
 Main Draw

Prosperita Open - Doubles
2011 Doubles